...from Hell was a one-hour ITV documentary shown in the United Kingdom on a semi-regular basis. It discusses and shows real-life footage of the experiences that people (mainly the British public) have witnessed on the subject of programme. For example, Weddings from Hell.

The programme began on 14 July 1997 with Neighbours from Hell. This was originally a one-off documentary to compete against the BBC with their current boom of docusoaps including Airport and The Cruise. This was soon followed up with the popular Holidays from Hell. The two aforementioned programmes are the most well known of the series.

The documentary was originally best noted for its dramatic 'flame-filled' title sequence, indicating a situation that could have originated literally 'from hell'.

It was narrated mainly by ex-Fawlty Towers actor, Andrew Sachs although others have included Ross Kemp and Fiona Foster.

In total, all 37 episodes were produced. 

The disasters-based documentary finally ceased operations for good in July 2010.

Versions 
Builders from Hell
Christmasses from Hell
Cruises from Hell
Dentists from Hell
Diets from Hell
Drivers from Hell
Extensions from Hell starring the Shannons
Facelifts from Hell
Filthy Homes from Hell
Flights from Hell
Garages from Hell
Gardeners from Hell
Holidays from Hell
Holiday Homes from Hell
Homes from Hell
Honeymoons from Hell
Hotels from Hell
In-Laws from Hell
Jobs from Hell
Journeys from Hell
Makeovers from Hell
Neighbourhoods from Hell
Neighbours from Hell
New Homes from Hell
Nights from Hell
Nannies from Hell
Restaurants from Hell
Roads from Hell
Salesmen from Hell
Staff from Hell
Teenagers from Hell
Tenants from Hell
Tourists from Hell
Tradesmen from Hell
Traffic Jams from Hell
Weather from Hell
Weddings from Hell

These programmes first aired on ITV Network and some are often broadcast each year. They are occasionally repeated on ITV2. American versions of the show were shown on The Learning Channel in 2001 and 2002.

References 

1997 British television series debuts
2010 British television series endings
1990s British documentary television series
2000s British documentary television series
2010s British documentary television series
ITV documentaries
Carlton Television
Television series by ITV Studios
Television shows produced by Central Independent Television
English-language television shows